Chunzeh-ye Olya (also Romanized as Chūnzeh-ye ‘Olyā; also known as Chūnzeh-ye Bālā) is a village in Ojarud-e Gharbi Rural District, in the Central District of Germi County, Ardabil Province, Iran. At the 2006 census, its population was 144, in 26 families.

References 

Towns and villages in Germi County